Valentin Rapp (born 16 September 1992 in Tettnang) is a German professional squash player. As of February 2021, he was ranked number 131 in the world.

References

1992 births
Living people
German male squash players